Stalag was a short-lived genre of Nazi exploitation Holocaust pornography in Israel that flourished in the 1950s and early 1960s, and stopped at the time of the Eichmann Trial, due to a ban by the Israeli government. These books were mainly about female German Nazi officers sexually abusing their male camp prisoners, yet they did not include any Jewish names to avoid taboos. They are no longer available in  traditional publication format, but with the advent of the Internet they have been circulating via peer-to-peer file sharing.

Premise
Purported to be translations of English-language books by prisoners in concentration camps, these books were highly pornographic accounts of imprisonment, generally of Allied soldiers, sexual brutalization by female SS guards (or in some cases by Imperial Japanese women), and the prisoners' eventual revenge, which usually consisted of the rape and murder of their tormentors. The books, with titles like I Was Colonel Schultz's Private Bitch, were especially popular among adolescent boys, often the children of concentration camp survivors.

History
Groups of Israeli publishers began to publish dime novel-format memoirs, describing abuse, particularly sexual abuse, in the concentration camps. Sold in magazine kiosks, the novels, ostensibly first-person memoirs, became best-sellers. According to filmmaker Ari Libsker, "the Holocaust pictures that I saw, as one who grew up here, were of naked women."

They disappeared almost as quickly as they appeared. Within two years of the appearance of the first publication, the publishers were accused by an Israeli court of distributing pornography and the books were discontinued. Although still available underground, certain titles earned the ire of the establishment, and efforts were made to find and destroy them. The advent of the Internet has allowed for peer-to-peer file sharing and thus made censorship attempts far harder.

In 2003, the genre re-entered public debate in Israel with the research of popular culture analyst Eli Eshed. As a result of that research, Israeli filmmaker Ari Libsker featured the books in a documentary film, which was titled Stalags.

See also

 Ilsa, She Wolf of the SS
 Nazi exploitation
 Stalags (film)

References

External links
 
 Village Voice

Israeli literature
Israeli pornography
Holocaust literature
Pulp fiction
Nazi exploitation